Brigitte Kernel (born 1959) is a French literary journalist and writer. She lived in Nancy until she was 19 years old. She remains today in Paris.

Life 
Brigitte Kernel was born in Rambervillers in the Vosges, in 1959. From childhood, she kept a diary. At 17, she sent her poems to the publisher Pierre Seghers. The latter gives her advice and encourages her in writing. The meetings have a great importance in the life of Kernel who was also advised by Simone Gallimard and Françoise Sagan with whom she was friends. Today, Kernel devotes herself exclusively to writing.

After having been a journalist at the Matin de Paris and then director of the programs of José Artur Pop Club and Who do I have the honor ?, she was producer-host of literary programs on France Inter, from 1990  to 2015.

For twenty years, Kernel wrote the weekly serials Cadavre Exquis for her literary programs, part of which is published by Librio. She has also been a literary columnist in Place aux livres on LCI with Patrick Poivre d'Arvor and in Rive droite / Rive gauche by Thierry Ardisson on Paris Première. She has, in her literary programs on France Inter, interviewed: Fred Vargas, David Foenkinos, Douglas Kennedy, Tatiana de Rosnay, Valerie Tong Cuong, Jean Teulé, Christine Angot, Amelie Nothomb, Grégoire Delacourt, Florian Zeller, Serge Joncour, Bernard Werber. And in their latest books François Nourissier, Cavanna, Andrée Chédid, Robert Sabatier, Bernard Clavel, Bernard Giraudeau, Regine Deforges, Genevieve Dormann, Yves Navarre. She is a member of the Lilac Academy which she, with Marie-Christine Imbault, co-founded in 2008.

Works

Novels 

 Une journée dans la vie d'Annie Moore, prix Paul Guth du Premier Roman, Presses de la Renaissance, 1993, 
 Un animal à vif,  Le Masque, 2001, 
 Autobiographie d'une tueuse, Flammarion, 2002, 
 Tout sur elle, Flammarion, 2003, 
 Les Falaises du crime, Flammarion, 2004, 
 L'amant de l'au-delà, Éditions du Masque, 2005, 
 Fais-moi oublier, Flammarion, J'ai Lu, 2007, 
 Ma psy, mon amant, Léo Scheer, 2011, 
 À cause d'un baiser, Flammarion, 2012, 
 Andy, Plon, 2013, 
 Dis-moi oui, Flammarion, 2015, 
 Agatha Christie, le chapitre disparu, Flammarion, 2016, 
 Jours brûlants à Key West, Flammarion, 2018,

Biographies 

 Michel Jonasz, Seghers, 1985, 
 Véronique Sanson, Seghers, 1990, 
 Louis de Funès, Editions du Rocher,2004, 
 Louis Chedid, sa vie et ses chansons, Seghers, 2005

References

External links 
 Official website 

1959 births
Living people
French radio presenters
French women radio presenters
French novelists
French women writers